Aleksey Gurman (born 14 August 1978) is a Kazakhstani diver. He competed in the men's 10 metre platform event at the 2000 Summer Olympics.

References

External links
 

1978 births
Living people
Kazakhstani male divers
Olympic divers of Kazakhstan
Divers at the 2000 Summer Olympics
Place of birth missing (living people)
Divers at the 1998 Asian Games
Asian Games competitors for Kazakhstan